Jean Labatut (born 14 March 1971) is a Brazilian sports shooter. He competed in the men's trap event at the 1996 Summer Olympics.

References

External links
 

1971 births
Living people
Brazilian male sport shooters
Olympic shooters of Brazil
Shooters at the 1996 Summer Olympics
Sportspeople from São Paulo